Concord School District is a public school district based in Concord, Arkansas, United States. The school district encompasses  of land.

In Cleburne County the district includes Concord, Drasco, Wilburn, and a very small portion of Tumbling Shoals. The district also includes portions of Independence County and Stone County. It also serves two unincorporated areas: Locust Grove and Ida.

The district proves comprehensive education for more than 500 pre-kindergarten through grade 12 students while employing more than 100 teachers and staff. The district and its schools are accredited by the Arkansas Department of Education (ADE).

History 
On July 1, 2004, the Wilburn School District consolidated into the Concord School District.

Schools 
 Concord High School, located in Concord and serving more than 175 students in grades 7 through 12.
 Concord Elementary School, located in Concord and serving more than 350 students in prekindergarten through grade 6.

References

External links 

 

School districts in Arkansas
Education in Cleburne County, Arkansas
Education in Independence County, Arkansas
Education in Stone County, Arkansas